Marta Bassino (born 27 February 1996) is an Italian World Cup alpine ski racer. She competes in all disciplines, with a focus in giant slalom, in which she has six World Cup wins.

Biography

Born in Cuneo, Piedmont, Bassino lives in Borgo San Dalmazzo.

At the Junior World Championships in 2014, Bassino won the gold medal in the giant slalom on her eighteenth birthday in late February. This win granted her an automatic start at the giant slalom of the World Cup finals in mid-March, which was her World Cup debut. The next season was her first on the World Cup circuit.

Career
In October 2016, she scored her first World Cup podium at Sölden, finishing third in the giant slalom won by Switzerland's Lara Gut; later in the season she repeated the same result in the giant slaloms in Kronplatz and Aspen - the letter together with teammates Federica Brignone and Sofia Goggia. Bassino was also part of the podium in Bansko in 2020, when Italian athletes took the top three places in the women's downhill.

Her first win was in a giant slalom at Killington in November 2019. 
In that year Bassino became the first Italian skier able to get on the podium in five different disciplines in the same season.

At her first World Championships in 2015, Bassino took part in the giant slalom, qualifying for the second run in 8th place, but did not finish.
At the Worlds in 2017 in St. Moritz, she finished eleventh in the giant slalom and 17th in the combined. At her first Winter Olympics in 2018 at Pyeongchang, Bassino was fifth in the giant slalom, tenth in the combined, but did not finish the first run of the slalom. In 2019 at Åre, she won a bronze medal in the team race (participating as a reserve) and was 13th in both the giant slalom and combined.

In the 2020–21 season, Bassino won four of the first five giant slalom races contested, also finishing on the podium in the sixth one – a third place in the home event in Kronplatz, Italy. She clinched the women’s World Cup crystal globe in the discipline on 7 March 2021, prior to the finals.
At the 2021 World Championships in Cortina d'Ampezzo, Italy, Bassino won the gold medal in the parallel giant slalom event, alongside Austria's Katharina Liensberger. She was a strong favourite for the giant slalom race, however, she finished in 13th place.

World Cup results

Season titles
 1 title – (1 GS)

Season standings

Race podiums
 6 wins – (6 GS)
 28 podiums – (20 GS, 4 SG, 2 AC, 1 DH, 1 PGS)

Podiums

World Championship results

Olympic results

National titles
Bassino has won four national championships at individual senior level.

Italian Alpine Ski Championships
Giant slalom: 2014, 2019, 2021
Slalom: 2019

See also
Italian female skiers most successful World Cup race winner

References

External links

Marta Bassino at Italian Winter Sports Federation (FISI) 
 

1996 births
Italian female alpine skiers
People from Cuneo
Sportspeople from the Province of Cuneo
Living people
Alpine skiers at the 2018 Winter Olympics
Alpine skiers at the 2022 Winter Olympics
Olympic alpine skiers of Italy
Alpine skiers of Gruppo Sportivo Esercito